Christian Levavasseur (born 6 March 1956 in Dinan) is a retired French cyclist, who won the combativity award in the 1980 Tour de France.

Biography 

Levavasseur became cadet champion of Brittany in 1973, and was professional from 1978 to 1985. After his professional career, he returned to amateur cycling in Brittany.

Career achievements

Major results

1977
 1st Stage 11 Tour de l'Avenir
1979
 1st Stage 6 Vuelta a España
1980
 1st Route Nivernaise
 5th GP de la Ville de Rennes
 10th Grand Prix de Mauléon-Moulins
1981
 1st Grand Prix de la Cote Normande
 2nd Grand Prix de Plumelec-Morbihan
 2nd Overall Grand Prix du Midi Libre
1983
 2nd GP de la Ville de Rennes
1984
 2nd Overall Tour d'Armorique
 5th GP Ouest France-Plouay
 5th GP de la Ville de Rennes
1985
 10th Bordeaux–Paris

Grand tour results

Tour de France 
Levavasseur rode the Tour de France five times, of which he finished four times.
 1979 : 51
 1980 : 44 (winner of the combativity award)
 1981 : 77
 1982 : Did Not Finish (DNF)
 1984 : 110

Vuelta a España 
 1979 : DNF
 winner one stage (held golden jersey for 1 week)

References

External links
 Palmarès of Christian Levavasseur
 

French male cyclists
French Vuelta a España stage winners
1956 births
Living people
People from Dinan
Sportspeople from Côtes-d'Armor
Cyclists from Brittany